Gulibagh literally mean in pushto language “the garden of flowers” is an administrative unit, known as Union council, of Swat District in the Khyber Pakhtunkhwa province of Pakistan.
District Swat has 9 Tehsils i.e. Khwazakhela, Charbagh, Kabal, Madyan, Barikot, Mingora, and Kalam. Each Tehsill comprises certain numbers of union councils. There are 65 union councils in district Swat, 56 rural and 09 urban. Union council Gulibagh includes small villages i.e. Gulibagh, Landake, Dakorak, Alabad, waliabad, Alamgunj and Roria. Cadet college swat is located in Gulibagh while the main campus of University of Swat is located in Alabad. 
Main personalities include
Muhammad Zia (ex-Tehsil counselor), Muhammad zaib khan (ex-Nazim) and Dr. Iftikhar Ali (Research Scientist at Columbia University Irving Medical Center, New York, USA; former at Chinese Academy of Sciences and University of Swat).

See also 

 Swat District

References

External links
Khyber-Pakhtunkhwa Government website section on Lower Dir
United Nations
Hajjinfo.org Uploads
 PBS paiman.jsi.com 

Swat District
Populated places in Swat District
Union councils of Khyber Pakhtunkhwa
Union Councils of Swat District